Klitterbadet is a bath house in Falkenberg, Sweden. It started as an outdoor bath in 1969, but was rebuilt as an indoor bath in 1983. It is the only 50 meter salt water pool with eight lines in Sweden.

External links
Klitterbadet

References

Bathing
Buildings and structures in Falkenberg